The Denmark Strait or Greenland Strait ('Greenland Sound') is an oceanic strait between Greenland to its northwest and Iceland to its southeast. The Norwegian island of Jan Mayen lies northeast of the strait.

Geography
The strait connects the Greenland Sea, an extension of the Arctic Ocean, to the Irminger Sea, a part of the Atlantic Ocean.

Hydrography
The cold East Greenland Current passes through the strait and carries icebergs south into the North Atlantic. It hosts important fisheries.

The world's largest known underwater waterfall, known as the Denmark Strait cataract, flows down the western side of the Denmark Strait.

Battle of the Denmark Strait

During World War II, the Battle of the Denmark Strait took place on 24 May 1941. The  sank the British battlecruiser , which exploded with the loss of all but three of its 1,418 crew;  was seriously damaged in the engagement. Bismarck entered the Atlantic through the Strait, but damage sustained in the battle—combined with British aircraft search-and-destroy missions—led to its sinking three days later.

See also
 Aquatic sill
 GIUK gap

References

External links
 

Straits of the Arctic Ocean
Straits of Greenland
Straits of Iceland
Greenland–Iceland border
International straits
Geography of North America
Geography of Northern Europe